Hernán Diego Vera (born 1970) is an American judge from California who has served as a judge of the Los Angeles County Superior Court since 2020. He is a nominee to be a United States district judge of the United States District Court for the Central District of California.

Early life and education 

Vera was born in 1970 in Escondido, California. He received his Bachelor of Arts, with distinction, from Stanford University in 1991 and his Juris Doctor from the UCLA School of Law in 1994.

Career 

Vera served as a law clerk for Judge Consuelo B. Marshall of the United States District Court for the Central District of California from 1995 to 1996. He worked as a staff attorney for the Mexican American Legal Defense and Educational Fund from 1996 to 1997. From 1994 to 1995 and again from 1997 to 2002, Vera worked as an associate and counsel at O'Melveny & Myers. From 2002 to 2014, he worked for Public Counsel, the largest pro bono public interest law firm in the nation, first as a directing attorney and later as president and CEO. Later, from 2015 to 2020 he was a principal at Bird Marella P.C. On November 13, 2020, Governor Gavin Newsom appointed Vera to be a Judge of the Los Angeles County Superior Court to fill the vacancy left by the retirement of Judge Elizabeth R. Feffer.

Nomination to district court 

On September 8, 2021, President Joe Biden announced his intent to nominate Vera to serve as a United States district judge of the United States District Court for the Central District of California. On September 20, 2021, his nomination was sent to the Senate. President Biden nominated Vera to the seat vacated by Judge Margaret M. Morrow, who assumed senior status on October 29, 2015. On October 20, 2021, a hearing on his nomination was held before the Senate Judiciary Committee. On December 2, 2021, his nomination was deadlocked by an 11–11 vote. On January 3, 2022, his nomination was returned to the President under Rule XXXI, Paragraph 6 of the United States Senate; he was renominated the same day. On January 20, 2022, his nomination was deadlocked again by an 11–11 vote. On June 22, 2022, the Senate discharged his nomination from committee by a 50–47 vote. On January 3, 2023, his nomination was returned to the President under Rule XXXI, Paragraph 6 of the Senate; he was renominated later the same day. On February 9, 2023, his nomination was reported out of committee by an 11–10 vote. His nomination is pending before the United States Senate.

See also 
 Joe Biden judicial appointment controversies
 List of Hispanic/Latino American jurists

References

External links 

1970 births
Living people
20th-century American lawyers
21st-century American judges
21st-century American lawyers
American judges of Mexican descent
American lawyers of Mexican descent
California Democrats
California lawyers
California state court judges
Hispanic and Latino American judges
People associated with O'Melveny & Myers
People from Escondido, California
Stanford University alumni
Superior court judges in the United States
UCLA School of Law alumni